"Extraordinary" is a song by British electronic group Clean Bandit, featuring vocals from Sharna Bass. It was written by Jack Patterson, Jimmy Napes, Grace Chatto and Gustave Rudman.

The song was issued as the fifth single from Clean Bandit's debut studio album, New Eyes (2014). The single and its remix EP were first released in Ireland on 16 May 2014, and was released in the United Kingdom on 18 May 2014.

Music video
The music video was filmed in Cuba. It was released onto YouTube on 2 April 2014 at a total length of four minutes and seventeen seconds. The video was made by the group and features Sharna Bass, who provides vocals for the track. As of April 2018, the video has received more than 34 million views.

Critical reception
The Guardian said that "there's a lot going on in the recent single Extraordinary – steel drums, pizzicato strings, rumbling timpani, cut-up vocal samples, chattering electronics – but you'd never notice, partly because the production is so polite and anaemic that it saps the constant musical shifts of their power, and partly because it's all buried underneath another rotten song, this time a kind of uplifting Emile Sandé-esque ballad: the result is about as extraordinary as branch of Tesco Express".

Track listing

Charts and certifications

Charts

Certifications

Release history

References

2014 songs
Warner Music Group singles
2014 singles
Clean Bandit songs
Songs written by Jimmy Napes
Songs written by Jack Patterson (Clean Bandit)
Songs written by Grace Chatto
Song recordings produced by Mark Ralph (record producer)